"Rocky Mountain" is a song by Swedish singer-songwriter Janne Lucas from his sixth studio of the same name (1981). Persson performed the song at Melodifestivalen 1981, where it finished in third place. It was written by Persson and Göran Ledstedt. The single peaked at number 14 on Sverigetopplistan.

Credits and personnel 

 Janne Lucas – songwriter, vocals
 Göran Ledstedt – songwriter
 Lennart Karlsmyr – engineering
 Åke Grahn – engineering
 Torgny Söderberg – engineering, arranger

Credits and personnel adopted from the Rocky Mountain album and 7-inch single liner notes.

Charts

References

External links 

 

1981 songs
1981 singles
Janne Lucas songs
Mariann Grammofon singles
Melodifestivalen songs of 1981
Songs written by Janne Lucas
Swedish-language songs